The Baily's beads effect or diamond ring effect is a feature of total and annular solar eclipses. As the Moon covers the Sun during a solar eclipse, the rugged topography of the lunar limb allows beads of sunlight to shine through in some places while not in others. The effect is named after Francis Baily, who explained the phenomenon in 1836. The diamond ring effect is seen when only one bead is left, appearing as a shining "diamond" set in a bright ring around the lunar silhouette.

Lunar topography has considerable relief because of the presence of mountains, craters, valleys, and other topographical features. The irregularities of the lunar limb profile (the "edge" of the Moon, as seen from a distance) are known accurately from observations of grazing occultations of stars. Astronomers thus have a fairly good idea which mountains and valleys will cause the beads to appear in advance of the eclipse. While Baily's beads are seen briefly for a few seconds at the center of the eclipse path, their duration is maximized near the edges of the path of the umbra, lasting 1–2 minutes.

After the diamond ring effect has diminished, the subsequent Baily's beads effect and totality phase are safe to view without the solar filters used during the partial phases. By then, less than 0.001% of the Sun's photosphere is visible.

Observers in the path of totality of a solar eclipse see first a gradual covering of the Sun by the lunar silhouette for just a small duration of time from around one minute to four minutes, followed by the diamond ring effect (visible without filters) as the last bit of photosphere disappears. As the burst of light from the ring fades, Baily's beads appear as the last bits of the bright photosphere shine through valleys aligned at the edge of the Moon. As the Baily's beads disappear behind the advancing lunar edge (the beads also reappear at the end of totality), a thin reddish edge called the chromosphere (the Greek chrōma meaning "color") appears. Though the reddish hydrogen radiation is most visible to the unaided eye, the chromosphere also emits thousands of additional spectral lines.

Observational history
Although Baily is often said to have discovered the cause of the feature which bears his name, Sir Edmond Halley made the first recorded observations of Baily's beads during the solar eclipse of 3 May 1715. Halley described and correctly ascertained the cause of the effect in his "Observations of the late Total Eclipse of the Sun [...]" in the Philosophical Transactions of the Royal Society:

The term "Baily's beads" then came into use after Baily described the phenomenon to the Royal Astronomical Society in December 1836. Having observed the solar eclipse of 15 May 1836 from Jedburgh in the Scottish Borders, he reported that:

In media
Cosmas Damian Asam was probably the earliest realistic painter to depict a total solar eclipse and diamond ring. His painting was finished in 1735.

The Baily's beads phenomenon is seen during the credit opening sequence of the NBC TV show Heroes, while the Diamond Ring effect is seen during the credit opening sequence of Star Trek: Voyager, albeit from a fictitious extrasolar body, seen from space.

Gallery

References

Notes

Citations

External links
 
 

Eclipses
Articles containing video clips